The 2010 Queen's Cup was the 34th edition of a Thai domestic football cup competition.

It was an invitational competition, and it was jointly hosted by Chonburi football club and the Football Association of Thailand.

Unlike the Thai Premier League, clubs didn't have to be public limited companies, so former football clubs in the Thai football league system could enter.

The champions received 300,000 baht while the runners-up got 150,000 baht.

The draw was made on 26 January 2010.

Group stages

Group A

Group B

Group C

Group D

Knockout stages

Quarter-finals

Semi-finals

Final

References

Qu
2010